Spencer Verbiest (born 6 February 1984) is a Belgian retired footballer who played as a defensive midfielder.

Career
Verbiest previously played for K.A.A. Gent, SC Heerenveen and Antwerp.

References

External links
 
 

1984 births
Living people
Belgian footballers
Belgian expatriate footballers
Association football defenders
Royal Antwerp F.C. players
K.A.A. Gent players
S.K. Beveren players
SC Heerenveen players
Royal Cappellen F.C. players
Challenger Pro League players
Eredivisie players
Footballers from Antwerp
People from Merksem
Belgian expatriate sportspeople in the Netherlands
Expatriate footballers in the Netherlands